The American Highland is the portion of Antarctica back of the Ingrid Christensen Coast and eastward of Lambert Glacier, consisting of an upland snow surface at  except for a group of nunataks (the Grove Mountains) near 75°E.  The area was discovered and named by Lincoln Ellsworth on January 11, 1939, in an aerial flight from his ship, and by Australian National Antarctic Research Expeditions (1956 and 1957), the latter group making a landing to obtain an astrofix at Grove Mountains, 1958.

References
 

Plateaus of Antarctica
Landforms of Princess Elizabeth Land